The 2002 Dagbon chieftaincy crisis, also known as the Yendi conflict, was a clash between two feuding factions that occurred at the Gbewaa Palace, Ghana from March 25–27, 2002, and resulted in the killing of Yaa Naa Yakubu II and 40 of his elders.

Committee of Eminent Chiefs
The Committee of Eminent Chiefs is a three-member committee of Ghanaian traditional rulers formed by the Government of Ghana to intervene the Dagbon chieftaincy crisis.

References

2002 in Ghana
Conflicts in Ghana
Conflicts in 2002
Dagbon
2002 crimes in Ghana